Hamza Al Sid Cheikh (born 16 April 1983) is the Algerian Deputy Minister for Saharan environment. He was appointed as minister on 2 January 2020.

References 

Living people
1983 births
21st-century Algerian politicians
Algerian politicians
Government ministers of Algeria